Jordan Public Security Directorate, or PSD is a public security agency of the Hashemite Kingdom of Jordan, which lies under the jurisdiction of the country's Ministry of Interior.

Background

Jordan's law enforcement is under the purview of the Public Security Directorate (which includes approximately 40,000 persons). The Jordanian national police is subordinate to the Public Security Directorate of the Ministry of Interior. The first police force in the Jordanian state, was organized after the fall of the Ottoman Empire on 11 April 1921. Ali Khulqi Pasha Alsharairi was appointed as the first commander of the security force and as a National Security Counsellor (minister) in the first Transjordan government. The first security force was composed of the Gendarmerie Battalion, and the Gendarmerie regiment, the reservist regiment, the regulars, and the desert patrol force. Until 1956 police duties were carried out totally by the Arab Legion and the Transjordan Frontier Force. After the 1956 Arabization of the Jordanian Army command, the Public Security Directorate was established.

Jordan's law enforcement ranked 24th in the world and 4th in the Middle East, in terms of police services' reliability, in the Global Competitiveness Report. Jordan also ranked 13th in the world and 3rd in the Middle East in terms of prevention of organized crime. 

The number of female police officers is on the rise in Jordan. In 1972, it was the first Arab state to introduce females to its police force. The number of police women grew from 6 in 1972 to over 3,500 in 2012.

The PSD established a police training center in Al-Muwaqqar which annually trains several thousands of police force members from neighboring Arab states, including; Palestine, Iraq and GCC countries. Another center established by Princess Basma specialized for training women, teaches the participants on details about the Jordanian penal code, the civil defence and public security laws and training on physical fitness, combat and defence skills.

PSD headquarters are located in Amman where they have an centralized system serving all areas in Jordan, designed to maintain public safety through the integration of modern equipment.

The current director is major general Fadel Al-Hmoud who was appointed on 25 February 2018.

Gallery

References

Law enforcement in Jordan